Symes Nunatak is a nunatak near the middle of Evans Neve in Victoria Land, situated 9 miles (14 km) southeast of Mount Staley. Named by the New Zealand Antarctic Place-Names Committee (NZ-APC) in 1983 after J. Symes, geological assistant in R.A. Cooper's New Zealand Antarctic Research Program (NZARP) geological field party to the area, 1974–75.

Nunataks of Victoria Land
Pennell Coast